The ChS4 is an electric mainline AC passenger locomotive used in Russia, Belarus, and Ukraine.

ChS4T modification 

To overcome some ChS4 shortcomings, in 1971 a modernized version of locomotive was released. It is known as ChS4T in USSR and as 62E in Czechoslovakia.

Gallery

See also

 The Museum of the Moscow Railway, at Paveletsky Rail Terminal, Moscow
 Rizhsky Rail Terminal, Moscow, Home of the Moscow Railway Museum
 Varshavsky Rail Terminal, St.Petersburg, Home of the Central Museum of Railway Transport, Russian Federation
 History of rail transport in Russia

References 

Škoda locomotives
Electric locomotives of Russia
Electric locomotives of the Soviet Union
25 kV AC locomotives
5 ft gauge locomotives
Railway locomotives introduced in 1963